Girard is a borough in Erie County, Pennsylvania, United States. The population was 2,994 at the 2020 census. It is part of the Erie Metropolitan Statistical Area.

History
Girard's history began with a petition to "Township Status" in 1832 by reassigning lands previously allocated to neighboring municipalities (Springfield, Fairview, and Elk Creek). The name is in honor of Stephen Girard, a banking tycoon of the late 1700s and early 1800s. Stephen Girard, a resident of Philadelphia at that time, was chosen for a variety of reasons. He owned much of the neighboring Springfield Township, and had been admired by the residents in the region. Additionally, Girard officials had been lobbying with Stephen Girard's foundation, upon his death in 1831, to be the site of the bequeathed Girard College. Despite this attempt, his family and will executors chose to establish the boarding school in Philadelphia where Stephen Girard had a long-standing tradition as a local philanthropist.

Geography
Girard is located in western Erie County at  (42.005954, -80.321481). It is bordered to the northwest by the borough of Lake City and on all other sides by Girard Township.

Elk Creek roughly follows the southwest border of the borough as it flows northwest to Lake Erie.

Demographics

As of the census of 2000, there were 3,164 people, 1,226 households, and 863 families residing in the borough. The population density was 1,345.0 people per square mile (519.8/km²). There were 1,269 housing units at an average density of 539.4 per square mile (208.5/km²). The racial makeup of the borough was 98.70% White, 0.38% African American, 0.28% Native American, 0.19% Asian, 0.22% from other races, and 0.22% from two or more races. Hispanic or Latino of any race were 0.60% of the population.

There were 1,226 households, out of which 37.2% had children under the age of 18 living with them, 51.5% were married couples living together, 13.7% had a female householder with no husband present, and 29.6% were non-families. 26.0% of all households were made up of individuals, and 13.2% had someone living alone who was 65 years of age or older. The average household size was 2.57 and the average family size was 3.10.

In the borough the population was spread out, with 29.4% under the age of 18, 6.9% from 18 to 24, 28.8% from 25 to 44, 21.6% from 45 to 64, and 13.4% who were 65 years of age or older. The median age was 36 years. For every 100 females there were 89.8 males. For every 100 females age 18 and over, there were 83.0 males.

The median income for a household in the borough was $33,977, and the median income for a family was $38,936. Males had a median income of $29,975 versus $23,712 for females. The per capita income for the borough was $16,682. About 6.5% of families and 8.3% of the population were below the poverty line, including 13.4% of those under age 18 and 5.2% of those age 65 or over.

Notable people
 Jack Allen, professional baseball player
 Marc Blucas, actor
 Bones Ely, professional baseball player
 Emma Gillett, lawyer and women's rights activist
 James Hervey Herron, mechanical and consulting engineer, metallurgist
 James M. King, Methodist minister and anti-Catholic political organizer
 David K. MacEwen, 59th Adjutant General of the United States Army
 Curt Miller, professional women's basketball coach
 Luke Smalley, photographer
 Denman Thompson, playwright and theater actor
Charlotte Elizabeth Battles, President of R. S. Battles Bank

References

External links

Girard Borough official website
Girard-Lake City Chamber of Commerce

Populated places established in 1846
Boroughs in Erie County, Pennsylvania
1846 establishments in Pennsylvania